The Dungeon Master: The Disappearance of James Dallas Egbert III is a 1984 book by private investigator William Dear, in which the author gives his explanation of the 1979 "steam tunnel incident" involving the disappearance of James Dallas Egbert III, a student at Michigan State University. In the book, Dear explained that he feels the incident was misrepresented by the news media.

Summary
Egbert was a 16-year-old child prodigy who was battling intense academic pressure, drug addiction, and personal issues. He had entered the school's utility tunnels with the intent of committing suicide and went into hiding after that attempt. After learning that Egbert had played Dungeons & Dragons, Dear, who was unfamiliar with the game, suggested that Egbert may have entered the tunnels to play a live-action version of the game. This theory was taken as fact by the media and caused intense controversy over the psychological effects of role playing games. After several weeks, Egbert gave himself up to Dear. 

In 1980, less than a year after the incident, Egbert committed suicide by self-inflicted gunshot wound. Dear kept the true circumstances of the disappearance a secret until four years after Egbert's death, due to a promise he made to the boy not to reveal them.

See also
 History of role-playing games
 Mazes and Monsters
 Media circus
 Moral panic

References

 Dear, William C. The Dungeon Master: The Disappearance of James Dallas Egbert III, Houghton Mifflin, 1984. (U.S. Hardcover ed.)
 Dear, William C. The Dungeon Master: The Disappearance of James Dallas Egbert III, Random House, 1985. (U.S. paperback ed.)

External links
 "The Disappearance of James Dallas Egbert III" by Shaun Hately 
 "The Attacks on Role-Playing Games" by Paul Cardwell, Jr.

1984 books
History of role-playing games
Houghton Mifflin books
Michigan State University
Non-fiction crime books